Kim Yarbrough (born August 1, 1971) is an American singer and actress.

Career
Kim started acting at the age of 8. Her first short was "2081" as an Orchestra Member, where she was the featured violinist. She then appeared on major TV series such as "Bones" and "Sonny with a Chance" as a larger woman and a gospel singer. Yarbrough then appeared in the TV Movie "Dad's Home" as Doris. In 2010 she guest starred on "The Defenders" in the pilot episode as the Clerk. She then played a recurring character part of the Requisitions Officer in the TV series "Dexter". She later appeared in another TV movie, "Grace", and then a short, "Mushroom Pizza". She joined the recurring cast of "Conan" playing numerous characters from 2010 to 2011. She is currently working on another movie called "Somewhere Slow". Recently she has co-starred in episodes of "Vegas", "Hollywood Heights", and "2 Broke Girls". Kim will also be playing a recurring role as Madame Labuef on the new Nickelodeon television series, "The Haunted Hathaways".

The Voice

Kim competed in the second season of The Voice. After having 2 judges turn around in the blind audition, she chose Adam Levine as her coach. In the battle rounds she sang "No More Drama" with fellow team-mate Whitney Meyer. After the battle, Kim was crowned the winner. In the live performances she sang "Rolling in the Deep" by Adele. In the eliminations, she was one of the bottom three on her team. For her song she chose "Spotlight" by Jennifer Hudson. In the end, she along with Karla Davis were eliminated in favor of Katrina Parker. She came in 18th place out of 48 contestants. She returned in the finale and sang "Superstition" alongside former contestants Naia Kete, Sera Hill and Cheesa.

Filmography

Discography

Albums

Extended plays

References

External links

 
 Official Website

1961 births
21st-century American singers
Musicians from Memphis, Tennessee
Living people
African-American women singer-songwriters
Actresses from Memphis, Tennessee
Singer-songwriters from Tennessee
21st-century American women singers
21st-century African-American women singers
20th-century African-American people
20th-century African-American women
The Voice (franchise) contestants